is a sweetener from Japan. Some  are produced in a very similar fashion to corn syrup and are very similar in taste.

Two methods are used to convert the starches to sugars. The traditional method is to take glutinous rice mixed with malt, and let the natural enzymatic process take place, converting the starch to syrup which consists mainly of maltose. The second and more common method is acid hydrolysis of potato starch or sweet potato starch by adding acid, such as hydrochloric, sulfuric or nitric acids, to make glucose syrup.

See also
Barley malt syrup
Corn syrup
 List of syrups

References

External links

Syrup
Wagashi